Heidelberg University is a private university in Tiffin, Ohio. Founded in 1850, it was known as Heidelberg College until 1889 and from 1926 to 2009. It is affiliated with the United Church of Christ.

History 
Heidelberg University was founded by the German Reformed Church as Heidelberg College in 1850 in Ohio. It is affiliated with the United Church of Christ, the successor to that denomination. In the mid-nineteenth century, there were a significant number of German immigrants in Ohio. The German Reformed Church had seventy-four churches in the state when members decided to establish the college. The college had five students enrolled in the first classes. By the end of the year, 149 students were enrolled.

Transition
On the morning of October 25, 2008 the Heidelberg College Board of Trustees unanimously agreed to transition to Heidelberg University. The name change went into effect at the beginning of the 2009–2010 academic year.

According to a statement issued by former interim President Dr. James Troha to all Heidelberg students: "In considering the transition from college to university, the board and senior administrators addressed such issues as competition and trends in higher education and the perception of "university" among prospective students in the U.S. and abroad. Thorough research of both internal and external audiences indicated strong support to become Heidelberg University."

Campus 
Heidelberg is situated on  enclosed in Tiffin, Ohio, the county seat of Seneca County, in northwestern Ohio. The campus is located on the east side of Tiffin on College Hill, within a half mile of downtown Tiffin.

Architecture 

Heidelberg's campus includes 26 buildings, 10 of which are listed on the National Register of Historic Places. The architecture ranges from pure Greek Revival and Victorian Gothic to English Gothic and the functional style. Many of the buildings are formed in gray Bloomville limestone with cut Bedford stone for trim, bringing a sense of overall unity to the various styles.

Academics 
Heidelberg offers 36 undergraduate courses of study, four graduate programs, 16 minors, and 13 pre-professional programs. The university has an honors program, The Life of the Mind, that focuses on four thematic components: the artist, the citizen, the scholar, and the scientist.

Its American Junior Year program at Heidelberg University in Heidelberg, Germany, is the oldest exchange program between an American university and a German university. Heidelberg is also home to the renowned National Center for Water Quality Research and The Center for Historic and Military Archaeology.

Faculty 
Eighty-five percent of the senior faculty members hold a doctorate or the highest degree in their core competency. The student-to-faculty ratio is 14:1 and the average class size is 20 to 25.

Student life

Students 
Students are culturally and geographically diverse, originating from all parts of the country. Eight percent of the students come from other countries. Fifty-three percent are male and forty-seven percent are female.

Roughly eighty-five percent of students live in campus-owned housing, which includes seven traditional residence halls, senior apartments, and an average of ten Cooperative Learning Communities (CLCs). CLCs are themed houses that provide students with the opportunity to develop initiatives and programs that will benefit the Heidelberg and/or greater-Tiffin communities.

Greek life
Heidelberg University has ten different social Greek organizations: five fraternities, four sororities, and one co-ed society. Each of the Greek organizations are local and specific only to Heidelberg University. They are governed by the Greek Life Council. In addition to this, Greek Life is accompanied by a chapter of the Order of Omega, an honorary Greek life organization.

Sororities
The Philalethean Society
Kappa Psi Omega 
Delta Sigma Chi
Zeta Theta Psi

Fraternities
Nu Sigma Alpha
Alpha Phi Tau
Sigma Tau Nu
Rho Eta Delta
The Excelsior Men's Society
Co-Ed Societies
The Euglossian Society

Athletics 

Heidelberg is affiliated with NCAA Division III athletics and is a member of the Ohio Athletic Conference. Heidelberg is the oldest member of the Ohio Athletic Conference which is the third oldest conference in the Nation and was founded in 1902. Heidelberg has won 46 Ohio Athletic Conference championships in the history of the athletic program which dates back to 1892.
The school is known for its distinctive "Student Prince" mascot, originating from the Sigmund Romberg operetta of the same name. On September 5, 2008, a redesigned "Student Prince" mascot was unveiled.

Men's Sports
Baseball
Basketball
Cross country
Football
Golf
Lacrosse
Soccer
Tennis
Track (indoor and outdoor)
Wrestling

Women's Sports
Basketball
Cheerleading
Cross country
Golf
Lacrosse
Soccer
Softball
Tennis
Track (indoor and outdoor)
Volleyball

Heidelberg University's long and storied history of intercollegiate athletics dates back to 1892, when The Berg beat Findlay in football, 20–0.  Since then, the athletic program has grown to 22 teams competing at the NCAA Division III level in the Ohio Athletic Conference.

Heidelberg adds varsity swimming and esports. Men's and Women's Swim returns to Heidelberg University starting for the 2023-2024 Season. The Swim Teams will be HU's first to compete at the varsity level since the early 1980s. Heidelberg will be the sixth Ohio Athletic Conference school to sponsor swimming.

Esports, short for electronic sports, is an organized competition between universities in a variety of video games.

Volleyball has qualified for the NCAA Tournament eight times (2007–2012, 2015–2016). They have won six OAC regular season titles (1986, 2009–2011, 2013, 2015) and two tournament titles (2010, 2015).

On the gridiron, the Student Princes won the 1972 Amos Alonzo Stagg Bowl under the guidance of head coach Pete Riesen.  Their longest stretch of success was under the tutelage of College Football Hall of Famer Paul "The Fox" Hoernemann.  The Fox led The Berg to a record of 102-18-4 in 14 seasons.  After falling on hard times in the 2000s, head coach Mike Hallett turned the program around.  Hallett snapped a nation-worst 36-game losing streak in the first game of the 2007 season.  By 2012, Hallett guided the Student Princes into the Division III Tournament.

Recently, the football program helped rewrite the NCAA record books. On November 16, 2013, tailback Cartel Brooks set an NCAA All-Divisions record with 465 yards of rushing in a win over Baldwin Wallace.  On November 3, 2018, punter Austin Baker set a D-III record with a 95-yard punt in a loss at John Carroll.

Men's cross country has had four-straight seasons of qualifying for the NCAA Championship, (2006, 2007, 2008, 2009) and seventh overall in school history (1997, 1998, 1999). They also captured their fourth OAC Championships in 2009, which added to their titles in 1998, 1999 and 2000. The Berg men's cross country team also was honored by the USTFCCCA in 2009 by having the second highest GPA in NCAA DIII and the fourth highest in the nation among all cross country teams in any division.

Wrestling has had five straight successful seasons in the OAC, and placed as high as sixth in the nation in the past five years. They captured OAC Tournament Championships in 2006, 2007, 2008, 2009 and 2010. The wrestlers were also OAC Regular Season Championships in 2006, 2008 and 2009.

Baseball has also had success over the past decade with two Regional titles, and seven OAC Championships. They were OAC Tournament Champions 2004, 2008, 2009 and 2010; and Regular Season 2003, 2007, 2008, 2009, 2010, 2015 and 2019. Also in 2010, they captured their first NCAA Regional Championship and finished fourth in the nation at the NCAA DIII Baseball World Series. Heidelberg hosted, and won, the first-ever Mideast Super Regional in 2019—sweeping The College of Wooster.

The men's track and field team also had success when it placed 14th in the nation in 2007. The team also captured its third OAC Outdoor Track and Field Championship in 2010, adding it to championship years of 1999 and 2000.

The Heidelberg men's running program (Cross Country, Indoor Track & Field, Outdoor Track & Field) in the 2009–2010 school year finished as the 14th best program among NCAA DIII schools because of their high event finishes at the NCAA Division III National Championships.

Notable alumni

 Franklin Gene Bissell, college football coach for the Kansas Wesleyan Coyotes
 Jim Boeke - NFL player in the 1960s. 
 Bob Briggs - Former NFL player for the San Diego Chargers, Cleveland Browns, and Kansas City Chiefs.
 John Buccigross – ESPN broadcaster
 Donteea Dye- NFL wide receiver for the Tampa Bay Buccaneers
 Bill Groman - NFL Player in the 1960s with the Houston Oilers, Denver Broncos, and Buffalo Bills.
 Sue Myrick - former Mayor of Charlotte, North Carolina and member of the US House of Representatives
 Michael Preston – Former NFL wide receiver for the Tennessee Titans
 Brian Regan – Comedian
 Frank Seiberling – Co-founder of Goodyear Tire & Rubber Company
 Gene Smith – Former General Manager for the Jacksonville Jaguars
 Doug Stephan - American radio talk show personality.

References

External links 

Official website
Official athletics website

1850 establishments in Ohio
Buildings and structures in Seneca County, Ohio
Education in Seneca County, Ohio
Educational institutions established in 1850
German-American culture in Ohio
 
Liberal arts colleges in Ohio
Private universities and colleges in Ohio
United Church of Christ in Ohio
Universities and colleges affiliated with the United Church of Christ